Renocera stroblii is a species of fly in the family Sciomyzidae. It is found in the  Palearctic

References

External links
Images representing Renocera at BOLD

Sciomyzidae
Insects described in 1900
Muscomorph flies of Europe